"Move It Like This" is a song recorded by the Bahamian pop group Baha Men. It was released in February 2002 as the second and title single from the seventh album of the same name. The song reached number 13 on the New Zealand RIANZ list, number 13 on the Canadian Singles Chart and number 65 on the Swiss Music Charts.

Composition
The song has dance-pop, reggae, and junkanoo elements.

Critical reception
The song received generally mixed reviews. musicOMH said of it, "Try to remember this song and you'll remember...nothing original." Conversely, Scott Tady of the Beaver County Times called the song "jubilant" and Rebecca Mahoney of the Lakeland Ledger referred to it as "energetic".

Music video
Directed by Bryan Barber, the video starts with the Baha Men's tour bus arriving at a college fraternity house filled with high-class students. The Baha Men tell them that they're here for 'the party' with the students protesting no party until the band forces themselves in to set up with a bunch of people coming up behind them hearing about the party. The party escalates from being a house party to going outside during the night with the police coming in to stop the party only for them to get sucked in by the music. Throughout the video, the partygoers perform dance moves that the Baha Men mention in the song from the twist, the electric slide and the robot.

Popular culture
The song was in the soundtrack of the 2002 comedy film Big Fat Liar, starring Frankie Muniz, Amanda Bynes and Paul Giamatti. It was also featured in the video game Dead or Alive Xtreme Beach Volleyball as well as in an NBA commercial. It was used in a promo for Nick Jr. that aired during the world premiere of the Blue's Clues special, "Meet Joe". It had kids and animated characters from Maggie and the Ferocious Beast, Dora the Explorer, Bob the Builder, Franklin the Turtle, Little Bear, Little Bill, and Oswald dancing to the song.

Charts

Weekly charts

Year-end charts

References

2002 singles
Baha Men songs
Bahamian songs
Music videos directed by Bryan Barber

da:Baha Men
de:Baha Men
es:Baha Men
it:Baha Men
no:Baha Men
fi:Baha Men
sv:Baha Men